Seppiana is a frazione of the  comune (municipality) of Borgomezzavalle in the Province of Verbano-Cusio-Ossola in the Italian region Piedmont, located about  northeast of Turin and about  northwest of Verbania.  

On 1 January 2016 it was merged with Viganella merged into the municipality of Borgomezzavalle.

 

Frazioni of Borgomezzavalle
Former municipalities of the Province of Verbano-Cusio-Ossola
Cities and towns in Piedmont